Muḥammad ibn ʿAbd Allāh Nasṭūlus (known as Nasṭūlus, but also referred to as Basṭūlus) was a 10th century astronomer. He is known for making one of the oldest surviving astrolabes, dated 927/928, as well as of another partially preserved astrolabe that bears his signature, "Made by Nasṭūlus in the year 315" of hijra (925).

Very little is known about Nasṭūlus. His full name, based on a testimony given by a contemporary astronomer, Abu Sa'id al-Sijzi, indicates that he was a Muslim, but some modern historians have suggested that his foreign last name may indicate that he was Greek or Nestorian.

References

Sources
 
  (PDF version)

Further reading
Websites
 
 
 

Journals

External links
 Image of one of the two astrolabes made by Nasṭūlus from the Al-Sabah Collection website
 Description of a manuscript dated Jumadi II 625 AH (May 1228) from the exhibition Scanning the Skies: A Virtual Exhibit of Astronomy Manuscripts at the University of Pennsylvania, showing a description of one of Nasṭūlus’s astrolabes

10th-century astronomers
Astronomers of the medieval Islamic world
Scientific instrument makers